The Robb House, located at 23 Park Avenue on the corner of East 35th Street in the Murray Hill neighborhood of Manhattan, New York City is a townhouse built in 1888-92 and designed in the Italian Renaissance revival style by McKim, Mead & White, with Stanford White as the partner-in-charge.

History
The townhouse was built as the residence of James Hampden Robb, a retired businessman and former state assemblyman and senator, and his wife Cornelia Van Rensselaer Robb. It was designed in the Italian Renaissance revival style by McKim, Mead & White, with Stanford White as the partner-in-charge; it was one of the earlier townhouses designed by White in that style. On its completion, architectural critic Russell Sturgis wrote that it was "the most dignified structure in all the quarter of town, not a palace, but a fit dwelling house for a first-rate citizen."

Subsequent owners
In 1923, the townhouse was bought by the Advertising Club of New York to be its clubhouse.  The club was founded in 1896 as the Sphinx Club but by 1915 had changed its name to the current one.  The conversion of the residential dwelling into a clubhouse was undertaken by F.T.H. Bacon as consulting engineer, and architect Fred F. French.  After a fire in 1946 damaged the top three floors of the building, and the club undertook repaired and renovated, at the same time purchasing the next-door rowhouse at 103 East 35th Street (built in 1853) and joining it to the main building.  In 1977, the club began to rent out space in the building to other clubs, and that same year it was sold to a developer who converted it into a cooperative apartment house. What served the club as its library was the living room of the duplex apartment owned by Kenneth Jay Lane. 

The building was designated a New York City landmark in 1998.

See also
List of New York City Designated Landmarks in Manhattan from 14th to 59th Streets

References

External links

 Advertising Club official website

1892 establishments in New York (state)
Residential buildings completed in 1892
Residential buildings in Manhattan
Renaissance Revival architecture in New York City
Park Avenue
Clubs and societies in New York City
Organizations based in New York (state)
Stanford White buildings
New York City Designated Landmarks in Manhattan
Murray Hill, Manhattan
Gilded Age mansions